Charles Munro (21 March 1871 – 7 February 1969) was an Australian cricketer. He played three first-class matches for Western Australia between 1905/06 and 1909/10.

See also
 List of Western Australia first-class cricketers

References

External links
 

1871 births
1969 deaths
Australian cricketers
Western Australia cricketers